The Portable Operating System Interface (POSIX, with pos pronounced as in positive, not as in pose) is a family of standards specified by the IEEE Computer Society for maintaining compatibility between operating systems. POSIX defines both the system and user-level application programming interfaces (APIs), along with command line shells and utility interfaces, for software compatibility (portability) with variants of Unix and other operating systems. POSIX is also a trademark of the IEEE. POSIX is intended to be used by both application and system developers.

Name
Originally, the name "POSIX" referred to IEEE Std 1003.1-1988, released in 1988. The family of POSIX standards is formally designated as IEEE 1003 and the ISO/IEC standard number is ISO/IEC 9945.

The standards emerged from a project that began in 1984 building on work from related activity in the /usr/group association. Richard Stallman suggested the name POSIX to the IEEE instead of former IEEE-IX. The committee found it more easily pronounceable and memorable, and thus adopted it.

Overview
Unix was selected as the basis for a standard system interface partly because it was "manufacturer-neutral". However, several major versions of Unix existed—so there was a need to develop a common-denominator system. The POSIX specifications for Unix-like operating systems originally consisted of a single document for the core programming interface, but eventually grew to 19 separate documents (POSIX.1, POSIX.2, etc.).  The standardized user command line and scripting interface were based on the UNIX System V shell. Many user-level programs, services, and utilities (including awk, echo, ed) were also standardized, along with required program-level services (including basic I/O: file, terminal, and network). POSIX also defines a standard threading library API which is supported by most modern operating systems. In 2008, most parts of POSIX were combined into a single standard (IEEE Std 1003.1-2008, also known as POSIX.1-2008).

, POSIX documentation is divided into two parts:
 POSIX.1, 2013 Edition: POSIX Base Definitions, System Interfaces, and Commands and Utilities (which include POSIX.1, extensions for POSIX.1, Real-time Services, Threads Interface, Real-time Extensions, Security Interface, Network File Access and Network Process-to-Process Communications, User Portability Extensions, Corrections and Extensions, Protection and Control Utilities and Batch System Utilities. This is POSIX 1003.1-2008 with Technical Corrigendum 1.)
 POSIX Conformance Testing: A test suite for POSIX accompanies the standard: VSX-PCTS or the VSX POSIX Conformance Test Suite.

The development of the POSIX standard takes place in the Austin Group (a joint working group among the IEEE, The Open Group, and the ISO/IEC JTC 1/SC 22/WG 15).

Versions

Parts before 1997
Before 1997, POSIX comprised several standards:
 POSIX.1: Core Services (incorporates Standard ANSI C) (IEEE Std 1003.1-1988)
 Process Creation and Control
 Signals
 Floating Point Exceptions
 Segmentation / Memory Violations
 Illegal Instructions
 Bus Errors
 Timers
 File and Directory Operations
 Pipes
 C Library (Standard C)
 I/O Port Interface and Control
 Process Triggers
 POSIX.1b: Real-time extensions (IEEE Std 1003.1b-1993, later appearing as librt—the Realtime Extensions library)
 Priority Scheduling
 Real-Time Signals
 Clocks and Timers
 Semaphores
 Message Passing
 Shared Memory
 Asynchronous and Synchronous I/O
 Memory Locking Interface
 POSIX.1c: Threads extensions (IEEE Std 1003.1c-1995)
 Thread Creation, Control, and Cleanup
 Thread Scheduling
 Thread Synchronization
 Signal Handling
 POSIX.2: Shell and Utilities (IEEE Std 1003.2-1992)
 Command Interpreter
 Utility Programs

Versions after 1997
After 1997, the Austin Group developed the POSIX revisions. The specifications are known under the name Single UNIX Specification, before they become a POSIX standard when formally approved by the ISO.

POSIX.1-2001 (with two TCs)
POSIX.1-2001 (or IEEE Std 1003.1-2001) equates to the Single UNIX Specification, version 3 minus X/Open Curses.

This standard consisted of:
 the Base Definitions, Issue 6,
 the System Interfaces and Headers, Issue 6,
 the Commands and Utilities, Issue 6.

IEEE Std 1003.1-2004 involved a minor update of POSIX.1-2001. It incorporated two minor updates or errata referred to as Technical Corrigenda (TCs).  Its contents are available on the web.

POSIX.1-2008 (with two TCs)
Base Specifications, Issue 7 (or IEEE Std 1003.1-2008, 2016 Edition) is similar to the current 2017 version (as of 22 July 2018).

This standard consists of:
 the Base Definitions, Issue 7,
 the System Interfaces and Headers, Issue 7,
 the Commands and Utilities, Issue 7,
 the Rationale volume.

POSIX.1-2017
IEEE Std 1003.1-2017 (Revision of IEEE Std 1003.1-2008) - IEEE Standard for Information Technology—Portable Operating System Interface (POSIX(R)) Base Specifications, Issue 7 is available from either The Open Group or IEEE and is, as of 22 July 2018, the current standard. It is technically identical to POSIX.1-2008 with Technical Corrigenda 1 and 2 applied. A free online copy may still be available.

Controversies

512- vs 1024-byte blocks
POSIX mandates 512-byte default block sizes for the df and du utilities, reflecting the typical size of blocks on disks. When Richard Stallman and the GNU team were implementing POSIX for the GNU operating system, they objected to this on the grounds that most people think in terms of 1024 byte (or 1 KiB) blocks. The environment variable  was introduced to allow the user to force the standards-compliant behaviour. This variable is now also used for a number of other behaviour quirks.

POSIX-oriented operating systems
Depending upon the degree of compliance with the standards, one can classify operating systems as fully or partly POSIX compatible.

POSIX-certified
Current versions of the following operating systems have been certified to conform to one or more of the various POSIX standards. This means that they passed the automated conformance tests and their certification has not expired and the operating system has not been discontinued.

AIX
HP-UX
INTEGRITY
macOS (since 10.5 Leopard)
OpenServer
UnixWare
VxWorks
z/OS

Formerly POSIX-certified
Some versions of the following operating systems had been certified to conform to one or more of the various POSIX standards. This means that they passed the automated conformance tests. The certification has expired and some of the operating systems have been discontinued.

EulerOS
Inspur K-UX
IRIX
OS/390
QNX Neutrino
Solaris
Tru64

Mostly POSIX-compliant
The following are not certified as POSIX compliant yet comply in large part:

Android (Available through Android NDK) 
BeOS (and subsequently Haiku)
Contiki
Darwin (core of macOS and iOS)
DragonFly BSD
FreeBSD
illumos
Linux (most distributions)
LynxOS
MINIX (now MINIX3)
MPE/iX
NetBSD
Nucleus RTOS
NuttX
OpenBSD
OpenSolaris
PikeOS RTOS for embedded systems with optional PSE51 and PSE52 partitions; see partition (mainframe)
 Redox
RTEMS – POSIX API support designed to IEEE Std. 1003.13-2003 PSE52
SerenityOS
Stratus OpenVOS
SkyOS
Syllable
ULTRIX
VSTa
VMware ESXi
Xenix
Zephyr

POSIX for Microsoft Windows
Cygwin provides a largely POSIX-compliant development and run-time environment for Microsoft Windows.
MinGW, a fork of Cygwin, provides a less POSIX-compliant development environment and supports compatible C-programmed applications via Msvcrt, Microsoft's old Visual C runtime library.
libunistd, a largely POSIX-compliant development library originally created to build the Linux-based C/C++ source code of CinePaint as is in Microsoft Visual Studio. A lightweight implementation that has POSIX-compatible header files that map POSIX APIs to call their Windows API counterparts.
Microsoft POSIX subsystem, an optional Windows subsystem included in Windows NT-based operating systems up to Windows 2000. POSIX-1 as it stood in 1990 revision, without threads or sockets.
Interix, originally OpenNT by Softway Systems, Inc., is an upgrade and replacement for Microsoft POSIX subsystem that was purchased by Microsoft in 1999. It was initially marketed as a stand-alone add-on product and then later included it as a component in Windows Services for UNIX (SFU) and finally incorporated it as a component in Windows Server 2003 R2 and later Windows OS releases under the name "Subsystem for UNIX-based Applications" (SUA); later made deprecated in 2012 (Windows 8) and dropped in 2013 (2012 R2, 8.1). It enables full POSIX compliance for certain Microsoft Windows products.
Windows Subsystem for Linux, also known as WSL,  is a compatibility layer for running Linux binary executables natively on Windows 10 using a Linux image such as Ubuntu, Debian, or OpenSUSE among others, acting as an upgrade and replacement for Windows Services for UNIX. It was released in beta in April 2016. The first distribution available was Ubuntu.
UWIN from AT&T Research implements a POSIX layer on top of the Win32 APIs.
MKS Toolkit, originally created for MS-DOS, is a software package produced and maintained by MKS Inc. that provides a Unix-like environment for scripting, connectivity and porting Unix and Linux software to both 32- and 64-bit Microsoft Windows systems. A subset of it was included in the first release of Windows Services for UNIX (SFU) in 1998.
Windows C Runtime Library and Windows Sockets API implement commonly used POSIX API functions for file, time, environment, and socket access, although the support remains largely incomplete and not fully interoperable with POSIX-compliant implementations.

POSIX for OS/2
Mostly POSIX compliant environments for OS/2:
 emx+gcc – largely POSIX compliant

POSIX for DOS
Partially POSIX compliant environments for DOS include:
 emx+gcc – largely POSIX compliant
 DJGPP – partially POSIX compliant
 DR-DOS multitasking core via  – a POSIX threads frontend API extension is available

Compliant via compatibility layer

The following are not officially certified as POSIX compatible, but they conform in large part to the standards by implementing POSIX support via some sort of compatibility feature (usually translation libraries, or a layer atop the kernel). Without these features, they are usually non-compliant.

AmigaOS (through the ixemul library or vbcc_PosixLib)
eCos – POSIX is part of the standard distribution, and used by many applications. 'external links' section below has more information.
IBM i (through the PASE compatibility layer)
MorphOS (through the built-in ixemul library)
OpenVMS (through optional POSIX package)
Plan 9 from Bell Labs APE - ANSI/POSIX Environment
RIOT (through optional POSIX module)
Symbian OS with PIPS (PIPS Is POSIX on Symbian)
VAXELN (partial support of 1003.1 and 1003.4 through the VAXELN POSIX runtime library)
Windows NT kernel when using Microsoft SFU 3.5 or SUA
Windows 2000 Server or Professional with Service Pack 3 or later. To be POSIX compliant, one must activate optional features of Windows NT and Windows 2000 Server.
Windows XP Professional with Service Pack 1 or later
Windows Server 2003
Windows Server 2008 and Ultimate and Enterprise versions of Windows Vista
Windows Server 2008 R2 and Ultimate and Enterprise versions of Windows 7
albeit deprecated, still available for Windows Server 2012 and Enterprise version of Windows 8

See also
 Single UNIX Specification
 POSIX signal
 POSIX Threads
 C POSIX library
 Common User Access – User interface standard
 Portable character set, set of 103 characters which should be supported in any POSIX-compliant character set locale
 Real-time operating system
 Interix – a full-featured POSIX and Unix environment subsystem for Microsoft's Windows NT-based operating systems
 TRON project – alternative OS standards to POSIX

References

External links

 
 

 
Application programming interfaces
Open Group standards
IEC standards
IEEE standards
ISO standards